Acridorex (INN; BS 7573a) is an amphetamine which was investigated as an anorectic but does not appear to have ever been marketed.

References

Acridines
Substituted amphetamines
Anorectics
Norepinephrine-dopamine releasing agents
Stimulants